The Canthyloscelidae are a small family of midges closely related to the Scatopsidae.

Adults are small to medium-sized (2.5-9.0 mm) flies, relatively stout, usually dark coloured Nematocera with stout legs. They are associated with ancient woodland. Larvae are xylosaprophagous and live in the moist, rotting wood of stumps and fallen trees.

Most are considered endangered due to the vulnerability of their habitat.

Fifteen described species live in New Zealand, North America, South America, Japan and Russia, and one is known from the Jurassic fossil record.

Systematics
Originally considered to be two separate families, the Synneuridae and the Canthyloscelidae. Haenni  placed the Synneuridae as the subfamily Synneurinae. A phylogenetic reclassification by Amorim  has reduced the Synneurinae into a synonymy of Canthyloscelinae.

 Genus Canthyloscelis Edwards, 1922
Canthyloscelis antennata Edwards, 1922
Canthyloscelis apicata Edwards, 1934
Canthyloscelis balaena Hutson, 1977
Canthyloscelis brevicornis Nagatomi, 1983
Canthyloscelis claripennis Edwards, 1922
Canthyloscelis nigricoxa Edwards, 1922
Canthyloscelis pectinata Edwards, 1930
Canthyloscelis pectipennis Edwards, 1930
Canthyloscelis valdiviana Tollet, 1959 
 Genus Exiliscelis Hutson 1977
Exiliscelis californiensis Hutson, 1977
 Genus Hyperoscelis Hardy & Nagatomi 1960
Hyperoscelis eximia (Boheman, 1858)
Hyperoscelis veternosa Mamaev & Krivosheina, 1969
 Genus  Prohyperoscelis Kovalev 1985 Itat Formation, Russia, Bathonian
Prohyperoscelis jurassicus †  Kovalev, 1985 
 Genus Synneuron Lundström 1910
Synneuron annulipes Lundström, 1910
Synneuron decipens Hutson, 1977
Synneuron sylvestre Mamaev & Krivosheina, 1969 
Synneuron eomontana  Kishenehn Formation, USA, Eocene
Synneuron jelli Koonwarra Fossil Bed, Australia, Aptian

References

Nematocera families
Psychodomorpha